HMS Scorpion was a  of the British Royal Navy in service from 1947 and scrapped in 1971.  Originally named Centaur, the ship was renamed Tomahawk and finally Scorpion (in September 1943) before her launch.

Royal Navy service
On commissioning Scorpion was allocated to the 6th Destroyer Flotilla (later squadron) which was made up of the Weapon-class destroyers. In 1953 she took part in the Fleet Review to celebrate the Coronation of Queen Elizabeth II. In 1954 Scorpion was the only Weapon-class ship fitted with the Limbo depth charge mortar, as a trial to modernise the whole class, replacing the older Squid mortar.

Following Home Service commissions she then undertook a commission in the Mediterranean during 1955 and 1956.  After this she was placed in reserve.

In 1957 all of the Weapon-class Destroyers started conversions to Radar pickets, which involved the removal of their torpedo tubes. Scorpion underwent her conversion at Devonport Dockyard.  She was fitted with an extra mast to carry a large AKE-1 Antennae. She was the last Weapon-class vessel to re-commission in 1959 and was part of the 7th Destroyer Squadron until being placed in reserve in April 1963.

Decommissioning and disposal
Following decommissioning Scorpion was used for underwater explosive trials at Rosyth. She was finally scrapped at Bo'ness in 1971.

References

Publications
 
 

 

Weapon-class destroyers
Ships built on the Isle of Wight
1946 ships
Cold War destroyers of the United Kingdom